Étusson is a former commune in the Deux-Sèvres department in western France. On 1 January 2016, it was merged into the new commune Saint-Maurice-Étusson.

Between 1962 and 2006 the registered population declined from 461 to 299, reflecting the mechanisation of agriculture the took place during the period along with the shortage of alternative employment opportunities in this part of rural France.

See also
Communes of the Deux-Sèvres department

References

Former communes of Deux-Sèvres
Populated places disestablished in 2016